Noah W. Wenger (born October 20, 1934) is a former Republican member of the Pennsylvania State Senate who represented the 36th District from 1982 to 2006. He represented the 99th district of the Pennsylvania House of Representative from 1977 to 1982.

References

1934 births
Members of the Pennsylvania House of Representatives
Pennsylvania state senators
Living people
People from New Holland, Pennsylvania